Brad Davis (born 30 April 1982) is a rugby league footballer who previously played for the Gold Coast Titans in the National Rugby League. He played as a half-back.

Early life
Davis grew up in New South Wales. He participated in many Catholic School Representative teams and other schoolboy football teams.

Playing career
In 2007 Davis helped the Tweed Heads Seagulls become the first NSW based team to win the Queensland Cup, winning the inaugural Duncal Hall Medal for man-of-the-match in the grand final.

Davis made his National Rugby League debut in 2008, playing in six matches for the Gold Coast Titans.

Davis is the Tweed Heads Seagulls leading points scorer of all time. He scored a total of 677 points in 92 games for the club in the Queensland Cup.

Post career
Davis coaches a Palm Beach Currumbin Sports High rugby league team.

References

External links
Tweed Heads Seagulls profile
Brad Davis finally gets his chance in NRL replacing Scott Prince
Davis to make belated NRL debut
Gold Coast Titans profile
Davis a chance to earn Titans debut
Gold Coast profile

1982 births
Living people
Australian rugby league players
Gold Coast Titans players
People from Tamworth, New South Wales
Rugby league halfbacks
Rugby league players from New South Wales
Tweed Heads Seagulls players